Edakkara is a town located in Malappuram district of the Indian state of Kerala. It is an emerging commercial hub, and one of the busiest towns in Nilambur Taluk.

Location
Edakkara is located near Nilambur, Malappuram District, in the State of Kerala. The town is an emerging hub in East Eranad region within the Nilambur Taluk and Malappuram district.

The town faces mountainous areas to its east, and is geographically bordered by two rivers.

Nomenclature 

The name of the town is said to have derived from the Malayalam word Edathavalam (ഇടത്താവളം). It means a brief stay in the course of a long journey. During the period of British colonization of India, the town was sought as a 'place to rest' amidst their sojourn from Kozhikode to Ooty and vice versa. According to some locals, the place is believed to have got its name from its geographical location between two rivers: Chaliyar and Punnapuzha.

History 

The history of Edakkra is intertwined with the history of Nilambur Kovilakam. Their land was divided into 18 Cherikkals (similar to today's ward system). Edakkara Panchayat was in the East cherikkal. That time people were forest dwellers; they were Malamuthar, Cholanaykkar, Malanaykkar, Aranadar, Paniyar, Kuruvar. Their main source of income was the forest itself. Muslims migrated to Edakkara for cutting trees and to collect bamboos from the forest. At about the same time Nair and Thiyya Communities migrated to Edakkara for agriculture.

People who migrated to Edakkara followed the rules and regulations of Thamburan (Ruler of the Nilambur) of Nilambur Kovilakam in spite of the religious and cultural differences. An increase in agricultural production brought other professionals to this land. They were blacksmiths, carpenters and workers for land cultivation. In 1920, Edakkara became a migrator's heaven. Government Higher Secondary School was established in 1946, which later became one of the best Government Schools in Malappuram.

After India's Independence, people started to migrate here from Travancore. Instead of Police Station, a police outpost was formed in May–June 1964. The inception of Post Office in the region was in 1940. The Navodaya library still plays a pivotal role in Edakkara culture which was started in 1957. Edakkara Village was formed during 1963–1964. Health centre, Registration office and Electricity office became a reality in 1981. A Lower Primary School which started in 1963, later went on to become a big private institution with several courses still functioning well by the name of Sree Vivekanada in Palemad.

1963 is the memorable year of Edakkara Panchayat because of its first election. Savior Master became the first President. Vazhikkadavu Panchayat was formed by dividing Edakkara Panchayat in 1969. In 1978 it was divided again to form Moothedam Panchayat.

Population 
As of 2020, the population of Edakkara is 44068. The male and female populations are 20912 and 23156 respectively. The size of the area is about 91.88 square kilometer.

Suburbs of Edakkara
 Karimpuzha, Valuvassery and Chungathara
 Palunda, Musliyarangady and Palathingal
 Marutha, Thannikadavu & Narokkavu
 Palad and Nellikuth
 Moothedam, Palankara
Palemad, Karunechi, Aranadampadam, Samkaramkulam

Transportation
The town connects to other parts of India through Nilambur town. State Highway No.28 starts from Nilambur and connects to Ooty, Mysore and Bangalore through Highways.12, 29 and 181. National highway No.66 passes through Ramanattukara and the northern stretch connects to Goa and Mumbai. The southern stretch connects to Cochin and Trivandrum. State. The nearest airport is at Kozhikode.

The town has bus services to four nearby Panchayats (Vazhikadavu, Moothedam, Pothukallu and Marutha), and to most districts in Kerala. Also outside the State to Mysore, Bangalore and Ooty. Two bus stations serve Edakkara. Many minibuses connect Edakkara to towns such as Barbarmukk, Karunnechi, Palemad, Marutha, and Shankaramkulam. It is also a stop for Super-Fast Buses that connect the area with Nilambur, Manjeri, Calicut and Perinthalmanna.

Governance

 Local Self Government: Edakkara Panchayat 
 Block Panchayat: Nilambur
 District Panchayat: Malappuram
 State Assembly Constituency: Nilambur
 Loksabha Constituency: Wayanad

Economy
Edakkara has become one of the fastest emerging commercial hub of the District. Trade is the primary occupation, especially in textiles, groceries and automobiles. Rubber and Black Pepper are the primary crops along with rice and coconut. Remitted income from Persian Gulf countries has supported the development of Edakkara.

Religious Places
There are four temples. The Sree Krishna Temple and Durga Devi Temple are situated in Edakkara Town and two Ayyappa Temples - one at Kaukkad and the other at Palemad. Also, four mosques, one in Musliyarangadi (the first mosque in Edakkara), one on the Post Office Road, the other two being on the Government School Road and KPM General Hospital Road. Many churches including St.Thomas Catholic Church in Palemad, St.George Malankara Church in Muppini,Assemblies of God in India church in Edakkara,India Pentecostal Church of God church Edakkara, Emmanuel Marthoma Church and Brethren Church in Munda and other Evangelical churches. The only church near to road from Nilambur to Vazhikkadavu is St George Malankara Catholic Church Muppini.

Education
The Government High School is situated in the heart of Edakkara Town. The other schools in and near Edakkara include the Guidance Public School, and the Sri Vivekananda Higher Secondary School.

See also
 Nilambur town
 Vazhikkadavu border town
 Gudalur
 Mango Orange village
 Pandalur town
 Devala, Nilgris
 Nilambur-Shoranur railway line

References

Villages in Malappuram district
Cities and towns in Malappuram district
Nilambur area